Mannermaa is a surname. Notable people with the surname include:
  (1916–1975), Finnish actor
 , (1871–1943) Finnish politician
 Olli Mannermaa (1921–1998), Finnish architect
 Tuomo Mannermaa (1937–2015), Finnish theologian